The 2023 Yokohama F. Marinos season is the club's 51st season in existence and the 41st consecutive season in the top flight of Japanese football. In addition to the domestic league, in which they are the defending champions, Yokohama F. Marinos participates in this season's editions of the Emperor's Cup, the J.League Cup and the AFC Champions League.

The club officially started the 2023 season resuming training sessions on 10 January 2023. They unveiled the team for the 2023 season including new signings presentations, as well as new shirt number system, on 14 January 2023.

Players and staff

Current squad

Out on loan

Transfers

Pre-season friendlies

Competitions

Overall record

J1 League 

Marinos is the current champions of the competition, winning the last season title on the last round after beating Vissel Kobe by 3–1. They stayed 2 points off Kawasaki Frontale, who also won their last league match against FC Tokyo, meaning that if Marinos had lost to Vissel, Frontale would be crowned J1 champions for a third consecutive season. With this title win, Marinos start the season as the second team with most J1 League titles, with 5 in total. They need 3 more titles to tie with 8-times J1 champions Kashima Antlers. The 2023 edition of the league is expected to start around February and March 2023.

League table

Results summary

Results by round

Matches 
The opening match was released by the J.League on 23 December 2022. The full league fixtures were released on 20 January 2023.

J.League Cup 

As Marinos qualified for the AFC Champions League, the club would immediately be awarded a bye from the competition's group stage, entering it only in the quarter-finals. However, as the continental tournament only starts on September, instead of early in the year (as usual), Marinos will have to play the group stage alongside the other 19 participating teams.

Super Cup

AFC Champions League 

Marinos qualified to play the 2023–24 AFC Champions League as 2022 J1 League champions. With the title, the club earned a direct entry to the competition's group stage. The group stage is planned by the AFC to start on 18 September 2023.

Goalscorers 
Updated as of 13 March 2023.

References

External links 
 Official website 

Yokohama F. Marinos seasons
Yokohama F. Marinos